Oasis is the collaborative studio album by American rappers and Diggin' in the Crates Crew members O.C. and A.G. It was released on November 24, 2009, through D.I.T.C. Records/Nature Sounds, after several pushbacks dating as far back as the spring of 2008. The album was first premiered in its entirety on the duo's Myspace page a week before the official release.

Recording sessions took place at Soul Estates in The Bronx, at Unique Studios in Norfolk, and In Ya Ear Studios in Long Island City. Production was handled by Born Lords (E-Blaze and Showbiz), Lord Finesse, Davel "Bo" McKenzie, KC and Statik Selektah, with D.I.T.C. and Devin Horwitz serving as executive producers. It features contributions from a female singer named Mirror Image, who sings the choruses on songs "Get Away" and "Pain", and DJ Premier's cuts on the song "Two For The Money".

Track listing

Sample credits
Track 1 contains a sample of "Phantom Lover", written by Jacqueline Hilliard and Leon Ware, as performed by Leon Ware
Track 10 contains a sample of "It's Yours", written by Kevin Keaton and Rick Rubin, as performed by T La Rock & Jazzy Jay
Track 16 contains a sample of "Industrial Power", as performed by Keith Mansfield

Personnel
Andre "A.G." Barnes – main artist, lyrics (tracks: 1–5, 7–11, 13–17)
Omar "O.C." Credle – main artist, lyrics (tracks: 1–7, 9–10, 12–13, 15–17)
Mirror Image – featured artist, vocals (tracks: 15, 17)
Christopher "DJ Premier" Martin – scratches (track 16)
Patrick "Statik Selektah" Baril – producer (track 1)
Eric "E-Blaze" Blaze – producer (tracks: 2, 6–9, 11, 12, 14, 17)
Davel "Bo" McKenzie – producer (tracks: 3, 4, 15)
Robert "Lord Finesse" Hall – producer (tracks: 3, 4, 15)
Rodney "Showbiz" LeMay – producer (tracks: 5, 10, 13, 16)
KC – producer (track 5)
Ramon Zuniga – engineering, mixing
Sprague "Doogie" Williams – engineering, recording
Vic Anesini – mastering
Devin Horwitz – executive producer
Azad Gonzalez – artwork

References

External links
 

2009 albums
Collaborative albums
Nature Sounds albums
O.C. (rapper) albums
Showbiz and A.G. albums
Albums produced by Lord Finesse
Albums produced by Statik Selektah
Albums produced by Showbiz (producer)